The Best Edited Variety Talk/Sketch Show or Special is one of the annual awards given by the American Cinema Editors. The award was first presented at the 2021 ceremony.

Winners and nominees
 † – indicates the winner of a Primetime Emmy Award.
 ‡ – indicates a nomination for a Primetime Emmy Award.

2020s

References

External links
 

American Cinema Editors Awards